Karbon (formerly Karbon14, Kontour, and KIllustrator) is a vector graphics editor. It is a component of Calligra Suite, an integrated graphic art and office suite by KDE. The name is a play on KDE and the radioactive isotope Carbon-14.

On 26 February 2012, the lead developer clarified on the Calligra development mailing list that the application’s name is simply "Karbon" without "14". 

As of March 2020, the project is not supported and looking for maintainer.

User interface

Dockers
Dockers are Qwidgets that you may attach to the main window or float freely. You may attach them one over another, resulting in tabs.

Stroke and fill
Stroke and fill allows you to set the outline or stroke colour, and the fill colour.

Fill options
 Empty indicated by  an "X" button
 Solid colour
 Gradient
 pattern Warning, patterns are rasters. If, using the Pattern Edit Tool, displaying a highly zoomed in area of a pattern may cause it to degrade in quality.
 Even-odd fill
 Winding fill

Tools
The tools Docker allows you to select which tool you want. Not all tools are always available. Example: the path editing tool is only available when a shape is selected.

Shape properties
The use of the Shape Properties docker is Unknown.

Toolbars
Toolbars allow you to display option otherwise some were in drop down menus. they may be edited by left clicking and selecting configure toolbars. The same option is under Settings. You may toggle which toolbars are visible by going to Settings, Shown toolbars and ticking them from there.

Tools

Shape handling tool
The Shape Handling tool allows you to select shapes. Once selected you may move, resize, pull, and rotate the shape. To resize a shape move your cursor to one of the corners of the selection box. Two arrows pointing in conflicting directions will appear. Then click and drag to resize the shape. If you want to resized it proportionally, hold down shift when Clicking and dragging. To move a shape around the canvas, click within the selected shapes selection box. Then hold your click and drag. This will move the shape.

Connect shapes tool
The Connect Shapes tool allows you to visually link shapes with auto updating black lines. This is more geared to flow charts.

Create path tool
The Create Path Tool allows you to draw vector lines and connect then to make shapes with the use of Bézier curve. If you are coming from using Adobe Illustrator it may help to think of the Create Path Tool as Illustrato's Pen Tool. Karbon's create Path Tool differs from its Freehand Drawing Tool which does not allow you to edit the curves and points while drawing.

Supported formats

Loading support
.ODG
.SVG
.WPG
.WMF
.EPS/PS

Writing support
.ODG
.SVG
.PNG Warning, this is a raster format which may cause poorer quality output.
.JPEG
.WMF
.Krita document or .kra Warning, this is a raster format which may cause poorer quality output.
.PDF available from the File drop down menu. Not available from save dialog in filters.

See also

Comparison of office suites
Comparison of vector graphics editors
Open Clip Art Library
List of free and open source software packages
Inkscape
sK1

References

Calligra Suite
Free software
Free vector graphics editors
Graphics software that uses Qt
Vector graphics editors for Linux